Árpád Bánkuti (born 13 May 1941) is a former Hungarian ice hockey player. He played for the Hungary men's national ice hockey team at the 1964 Winter Olympics in Innsbruck.

References

1941 births
Living people
Hungarian ice hockey left wingers
Ice hockey people from Budapest
Ice hockey players at the 1964 Winter Olympics
Olympic ice hockey players of Hungary
Újpesti TE (ice hockey) players